Dystopia is the second studio album by Canadian death metal band Beneath the Massacre. It was released on October 28, 2008 through Prosthetic Records.

The song "Never More" is a re-recorded version of the track of the same name found on their first EP, Evidence of Inequity.

Musical and lyrical themes

Promotion
On July 3, 2008, a message was posted on Beneath the Massacre's official website about the first in a series of in-studio videos featuring footage from Northern Studio.

On August 14, 2008, a message was posted in Beneath the Massacre's official website regarding the second video for the  making of Dystopia, featuring bass and guitar recording sessions, and also a link to Prostheric Records pre-order the album, currently available on CD and vinyl formats.

Track listing

Personnel
Beneath the Massacre
 Elliot Desgagnés − vocals
 Christopher Bradley − guitar
 Dennis Bradley − bass
 Justin Rousselle − drums

Productions
 Yannick St-Amand – producer
 Felix Rancourt – artwork
 Alan Douches – master
 Jason Suecof – mixer

References

2008 albums
Beneath the Massacre albums
Dystopian music
Prosthetic Records albums